The 2013 Tour de Wallonie was the 40th edition of the Tour de Wallonie cycle race and was held on 20–24 July 2013. The race started in Ans and finished in Thuin. The race was won by Greg Van Avermaet.

Teams
Seventeen teams competed at the 2013 Tour de Wallonie. These included ten UCI ProTeams, five UCI Professional Continental Teams, and two UCI Continental Teams.

UCI ProTeams

 
 
 
 
 
 
 
 
 
 

UCI Professional Continental Teams

 
 
 
 
 

UCI Continental Teams

Route

Stages

Stage 1
20 July 2013 – Ans to Eupen,

Stage 2
21 July 2013 – Verviers to Engis,

Stage 3
22 July 2013 – Beaufays to Bastogne,

Stage 4
23 July 2013 – Andenne to Clabecq,

Stage 5
24 July 2013 – Soignies to Thuin,

Classification Leadership

Final Classification Standings

General classification

Points classification

Mountains classification

Young rider classification

Sprint classification

Combativity classification

Teams classification

Notes

References

Tour de Wallonie
2013 in Belgian sport